Thomas Grace (August 2, 1841 – December 27, 1921) was an Irish-born prelate of the Roman Catholic Church.  He served as the second bishop of the Diocese of Sacramento in California from 1896 to his death in 1921.

Biography

Early life 
Thomas Grace was born on August 2, 1841, in Wexford, Ireland. He was educated at St Peter's College, Wexford and All Hallows Missionary College, Dublin.

Priesthood 
Grace was ordained a priest for the Archdiocese of Dublin in Dublin on June 24, 1876. After his ordination, Grace travelled to California.  He served as pastor of several churches in Eureka, California, Carson City, Nevada, and Marysville, California. Grace dedicated St. Mary of the Lake Church in Nevada on the Feast of the Assumption, 1881. Eventually, Grace became the pastor of the pro-cathedral, Saint Rose of Lima Catholic Church, whose land was donated by the first governor of California, Peter Burnett.

Bishop of Sacramento 
On February 27, 1896, Pope Leo XIII appointed Grace bishop of the Sacramento Diocese. He was consecrated on June 16, 1896, by Archbishop Patrick Riordan.  

Grace dedicated St. Patrick Church in Scotia, California, on March 28, 1905, and St. Joseph Catholic Church in Redding, California, on April 30, 1905. On October 30, 1906, he was given the property deed in Red Bluff, California, with the provision that it remain as a hospital for the Sisters of Mercy. On June 22, 1919, Grace dedicated St. Gall Catholic Church in Gardnerville, Nevada.

Grace helped launch the diocesan newspaper, The Catholic Herald, with a message endorsing its scope and usefulness to the diocese on March 14, 1908.

Death and legacy 
Patrick Grace died in Sacramento on December 27, 1921.Grace Day Home in Sacramento  was named for him.

References

1846 births
1921 deaths
19th-century Irish Roman Catholic priests
Roman Catholic bishops of Sacramento
19th-century Roman Catholic bishops in the United States
20th-century Roman Catholic bishops in the United States
Christian clergy from County Wexford
Irish emigrants to the United States (before 1923)
Alumni of All Hallows College, Dublin
People educated at St Peter's College, Wexford